Air Bud: World Pup, also known as Air Bud 3, is a 2000 sports comedy film directed by Bill Bannerman. The third film in the Air Bud series, it was the 2nd to be filmed without Buddy, the canine star of the first film; Buddy died after production of the first film. Air Bud: World Pup was the first film in the Air Bud series not to be released theatrically in the U.S., opting to only be released on video, but was played in Philippine theaters for a limited time.

Plot
Teenager Josh Framm's mother, Jackie, has just married her veterinarian boyfriend, Dr. Patrick Sullivan (Dale Midkiff). Josh and his best friend, Tom Stewart (Shayn Solberg), just made their school's soccer team when their coach reveals that their team will become co-ed. Josh meets Emma Putter, an attractive, wealthy girl who just moved to Fernfield from England after her mother's death, who will not only be playing on his soccer team, but also has a golden retriever named Molly, who Buddy also finds attractive. Emma invites Josh to a party at her house and Tom arrives dressed up like a British soldier and looking quite silly wearing a kilt. At the same time, things work out between Buddy and Molly and they become infatuated on the second floor in Emma's house. Josh's sister, Andrea Framm (Caitlin Wachs) and her best friend, Tammy (Chantal Strand), want to scope out what's really going on at the party. Molly quickly has puppies with Buddy. Next, it is discovered that Buddy also has the uncanny ability to play soccer. However, the soccer committee decided on the recommendation of chairman Jack Stearns to ban the Timberwolves from the soccer league all because they had Buddy on their team.

The Timberwolves were given two options: either remove Buddy from their team or remove their team from the league (either way, the Springbrook Spartans, the team Jack serves as coach of, would have rectified their 3-1 loss to the Timberwolves). Knowing Buddy was the star player, they naturally quit the league. When Jack's son, Spartans all-star captain Steve Stearns, learns that the Timberwolves have been banned from the league, he's outraged and confronts his father, leading to Jack calling Timberwolves coach Montoya and informing him that, after careful consideration, the committee had a change of heart and the Timberwolves were back in the league. Buddy has a uniform and is on the roster, leading Josh's soccer team to the state championship against the Spartans. However, trouble ensues when Buddy and Molly's six newborn puppies are kidnapped by a man called Snerbert (Martin Ferrero), who wants to sell them. Once they are caught by Josh, Andrea, Emma, and Snerbert's assistant, Webster (Don McMillan), the butler Emma's father, Geoffrey (Duncan Regehr), hired to help care for Molly during her pregnancy, threw Snerbert under the bus by revealing the motive for the kidnapping: Snerbert wanted to get rich, while Webster just wanted a puppy, something he always wanted since childhood. Webster subsequently offers to drive Andrea, Josh, Emma and Buddy to the stadium, which the Timberwolves were losing because Emma, Josh and Buddy were missing, while an army of dogs stayed behind to make sure Snerbert didn't try to go anywhere. The Timberwolves subsequently win the championship thanks to a game-winning goal by Buddy. Afterwards, Buddy helps the United States women's national soccer team win the FIFA Women's World Cup in a penalty shootout against Norway .

Cast
 Kevin Zegers - Josh Framm
 Martin Ferrero - Snerbert
 Dale Midkiff - Dr. Patrick Sullivan
 Caitlin Wachs - Andrea Framm
 Chilton Crane - Jackie Framm-Sullivan
 Brittany Paige Bouck - Emma Putter 
 Shayn Solberg - Tom Stewart
 Miguel Sandoval - Coach Montoya
 Chantal Strand - Tammy
 Duncan Regehr - Geoffrey Putter
 Briana Scurry - Herself
 Brandi Chastain - Herself
 United States women's national soccer team players - themselves
 Alexander Ludwig - Cameo
 Don McMillan - Webster

Film location
Shooting took place in Vancouver. The soccer field and red brick buildings in the background are part of Shaughnessy Elementary School.

Release
The movie was released directly to DVD and VHS on December 12, 2000 by Buena Vista Home Entertainment. Walt Disney Studios Home Entertainment continued its line of Air Bud Special Edition DVDs with the release of Air Bud: World Pup Special Edition on June 16, 2010.

Mill Creek Entertainment reissued the movie on January 14, 2020 on a 2-disc boxset also containing the other Air Bud movies owned by Air Bud Entertainment.

Reception
Michael Scheinfeld from Common Sense Media gave the film four stars out of five, saying the film "has a big heart and positive values involving sharing, cooperation, and friendship, but it never gets preachy or sappy".

References

External links
 
 
 Air Bud: World Pup at Allmovie
 

American sequel films
2000 films
Disney direct-to-video films
2000 direct-to-video films
Films about dogs
American association football films
American sports comedy films
American direct-to-video films
American children's comedy films
Films about animals playing sports
Air Bud (series)
2000s English-language films
2000s sports comedy films
Films shot in Vancouver
Dimension Films films
Films about animals
2000 directorial debut films
2000 comedy films
Canadian sports comedy films
Canadian children's comedy films
Canadian sequel films
Canadian direct-to-video films
2000s American films
2000s Canadian films